William Cunningham Phelps (April 5, 1934 – March 19, 2019) was a Republican politician and lawyer from Missouri. Phelps was born and raised in Nevada, Missouri.

Biography 
Phelps attended the University of Missouri and graduated with a degree in economics in 1956 and a law degree in 1959. Following graduation he began practicing law with a Kansas City firm.

Phelps was elected to the Missouri House of Representatives from the Kansas City area in 1960 and was re-elected five times. In 1972, he was elected  the 40th Lieutenant Governor of Missouri and was re-elected in 1976. Phelps campaigned on a pledge to be Missouri's first "full time" Lieutenant Governor and upon his election to that office, he gave up the practice of law. In 1980 Phelps was an unsuccessful candidate for the Republican nomination for Governor of Missouri. He lost the Republican primary election to former Governor Kit Bond.

After a sixteen-year absence from public life, in 1996 Phelps ran for Congress in Missouri's 4th congressional district. Phelps won the primary, but was defeated in November by the incumbent, Ike Skelton. Phelps worked as the national spokesman for Americans for Fair Tax, a group that advocates replacing the income tax with a national sales tax.

Phelps died in Houston, Texas following a short illness. He was 84.

References

External links 
 

1934 births
2019 deaths
People from Nevada, Missouri
Republican Party members of the Missouri House of Representatives
Lieutenant Governors of Missouri
University of Missouri alumni
People from Kansas City, Missouri
Missouri lawyers
20th-century American lawyers